Adrian Orr is a New Zealand economist and current Governor of the Reserve Bank of New Zealand.

Early life 
Orr has Cook Island heritage through his grandfather No'oroa George, who moved to New Zealand in the 1930s. His father was of Irish descent and died when Orr was 13.

Orr was born and raised in Taupō in the Waikato. At the time his father died, he had almost finished building a motel in Taupō. The family received help from his father's workmates to complete the building. The family then ran the motel during Orr's secondary schooling. As a young man, Orr worked in a range of jobs, including as a plumber, sewerage pipe layer, short order cook, dishwasher, and driving machinery for a local Taupō firm.

He has a Bachelor of Social Sciences (Economics and Geography) from the University of Waikato, and a master's degree in development economics (with distinction) from the University of Leicester, England.

Career 
From 1997 to 2000, he was chief manager of the Economics Department of the Reserve Bank of New Zealand.

He has worked as an economist at the OECD and the New Zealand Treasury, and was Chief Economist for the New Zealand National Bank and Westpac Bank (2000–2003).

From 2003 to 2007, he was Deputy Governor and Head of Financial Stability at the Reserve Bank.

NZ Super Fund 
In 2007, he was appointed Chief Executive of the New Zealand Superannuation Fund (the NZ Super Fund). Orr said he enjoyed the job's "beautiful mix [of] big, long-term, intergenerational challenges — and its hard-edge economics and finance."

In 2017, while Chief Executive of the New Zealand Superannuation Fund, the size of his salary (almost $1 million) and his annual pay increase of 36 per cent caused controversy. Prime Minister Bill English and the State Services Commission objected to the increase, and English said the NZ Super Fund Board members who had approved the increase could lose their positions as a result. The board members' position was that Orr's salary was in line with the market.

Governor of the Reserve Bank 
Orr was appointed by Finance Minister Grant Robertson to be Governor in December 2017 (succeeding Graeme Wheeler, then acting Governor Grant Spencer). He started in the role in March 2018.

Robertson noted at the time of his appointment that the Sixth Labour Government was reviewing the Reserve Bank Act, and Orr would be well placed to steer the Bank through the review. Before his appointment the Government had signalled its intention to add maximising employment to the Reserve Banks's objectives in addition to its inflation target.

On 8 November 2021, the Government extended Orr's position as Governor General for another five years at the recommendation of the Reserve Bank Board. While Robertson supported Orr's reappointment on the grounds of continuity and stability, the opposition National Party finance spokesperson Nicola Willis called for an independent review of the Reserve Bank's performance. National Party leader Christopher Luxon also questioned the Government's decision to extend Orr's position for another five-year term prior to the 2023 New Zealand general election. ACT Party leader David Seymour opposed Orr's reappointment on the grounds of what it described as his "poor leadership, poor focus and poor outcomes".

Personal life 
Orr is married to novelist Sue Orr, and has three children.

References

External links 

 Profile - Reserve Bank of New Zealand website

Living people
20th-century New Zealand economists
New Zealand people of Cook Island descent
New Zealand people of Irish descent
University of Waikato alumni
Alumni of the University of Leicester
New Zealand public servants
Year of birth missing (living people)
People from Taupō
21st-century New Zealand economists